"A Beat for You" is a song by Australian pop group Pseudo Echo. The song was released in April 1984 as the second single from their debut studio album, Autumnal Park (1984). The song peaked at number 12 on the Australian Kent Music Report.

A slightly updated version of the song appeared as the leadoff track on the North American release of the group's follow-up album, Love an Adventure.  Referring to this version, AllMusic said, "driving hard rock riffs puncture Pierre Gigliotti and James Leigh's wall of synthesizers. Vocalist Brian Canham has a darkly erotic voice that only new wave groups seem to breed -- imagine a cross between Jim Kerr of Simple Minds and Midge Ure."

Track listing 
7" (EMI-1252)
Side A "A Beat for You" – 3:43
Side B "Autumnal Park" – 4:10

12" (EMI – ED 81)
Side A "A Beat for You" (extended) – 7:36
Side B "Autumnal Park" – 4:10
Side B "A Beat for You" (single) – 3:43

Charts

Weekly charts

Year-end charts

References 

1982 songs
1984 singles
Pseudo Echo songs
Song recordings produced by John Punter